The list of auxiliary ship classes in service includes all auxiliary ships in naval service in the world.  For combatant ships, see the list of naval ship classes in service.

Command and support ships

Command ships 
 Andenes command ship
 Builder: 
 Displacement: 3,000 tons
 Operator: : 3 in commission

 HSwMS Trossö Command ship
 2,140 tones
 Operator:

River command ships 
 Kozara river command ship
 Builder:  
 Displacement:  600 tons
 Operator:

Amphibious command ships 
 Blue Ridge-class joint command ship (LCC-19)
 Builder:  
 Displacement:  19,700 tons
 Operator:  : 2 in commission

Minecraft command and support ships 
 Godetia minecraft tender
 Displacement:  2,500 tons
 Operator:

Multi-role support ships 
 Absalon-class flexible support ship / flexible combat vessel
 Builder: 
 Displacement: 4500 tons (light), 6,600 tons (full load)
 Operator: :  2 ships commissioned. (Arguably a support ship, armed as a frigate)

 Karel Doorman-class multi-function support ship
 Builder: 
 Displacement: max 27,500 tons
 Operator: : 1 commissioned around 2014

  multi-role offshore support ship
 Builder: 
 Displacement:  5,741 tons
 Operator:  

 Shichang multi-role training/support ship
 Displacement:  9,500 tons
 Operator:

Medical ships

Hospital ships 
 Mercy-class hospital ship (AH-19)
 Builder:  
 Displacement:  69,360 tonnes
 Operator:  :  2 in commission

 Project 320A hospital ship
 Builder:  
 Displacement:  11570 tonnes
 Operator:  :  2 in commission

 RFA Argus Primary Casualty Receiving Ship (A135)
 builder:  converted by 
 Displacement:  28,081 tonnes
 Operator:   (Royal Fleet Auxiliary)

 Daishan Dao-class hospital ship (866)
 Builder:  
 Displacement:  14,000 tonnes
 Operator:

Medical evacuation ships 
 Zhuanghe medical evacuation ship
 Builder:  
 Operator:

Ambulance transport ships 
 Qiongsha class ambulance transport ship
 Builder:  
 Displacement:  2,150 tonnes
 Operator:  :  1 in commission

Ambulance craft 
 Beiyi 01-class fast ambulance craft
 Builder:  
 Operator:  :  5 in commission

Ammunition ships 
 Builder:  
 Displacement:  410 tonnes
 Operator:  :  1 in service

 Type 072-class ammunition ship 
 Builder:  
 Displacement:  4,170 tonnes
 Operator:  :  3 in service

Missile/rocket ammunition ships 
 Yuan Wang 21 missile/rocket ammunition ship 
 Builder:  
 Displacement:  9,080 tonnes
 Operator:  

 Yuan Wang 22 missile/rocket ammunition ship 
 Builder:  
 Operator:

Replenishment ships 
 Fort Rosalie-class replenishment ship
 Builder: 
 Displacement:  23,890 tons
 Operator: , ( Royal Fleet Auxiliary), 2 in service

 Lewis and Clark-class dry cargo/ammunition ship (T-AKE-1)
 Builder:  
 Displacement:  41,000 tons
 Operator:  :  14 in commission

 Poolster-class replenishment ship
 Builder:  
 Displacement:  16,836 tons
 Operator: :  1 in service

 Type 903 (Fuchi-class) replenishment ship
 Builder:  
 Displacement:  20,500 tons
 Operator:  : 2 in commission

 Type 903A-class replenishment ship
 Builder:  
 Displacement:  23,400 tons
 Operator:  

 Type 904 (Dayun-class) stores ship
 Builder:  
 Displacement:  10,975 tons
 Operator:  :  2 in service

 Type 908 (Fusu- or Nancang-class) replenishment ship
 Builder:  
 Displacement:  37,000 tons
 Operator:  :  1 in commission

 Westerwald-class transport ship
 Builder: 
 Displacement: 4,042 tons
 Operator: : 1 in service

Fast combat support ships 
 Cheonji-class fast combat support ship
 Builder: 
 Displacement: 9,113 tons
 Operator : 3 in service

 Panshih-class (AOE-532) fast combat support ship
 Builder:  
 Displacement:  20,000 tons
 Operator: :  1 in service

 Supply-class fast combat replenishment ship (AOE-6)
 Builder:  
 Displacement:  50,000 tons
 Operator:  :  2 in commission

 Type 901 class fast combat support ship
 Builder:  
 Displacement:  45,000 tons
 Operator:  :  2 in commission

Tankers

Replenishment oilers 
 Akar-class replenishment oiler
 Builder:  
 Displacement:  19,350 tons
 Operator:  :  2 in service

  replenishment oiler
 Builder: 
 Displacement:  26,000 tons
 Operator:  

 Berlin-class (Type 702) combat support ship
 Builder: 
 Displacement: 20,240 tons
 Operator : 3 in service

 Cantabria (A15) replenishment oiler
 Builder:  
 Displacement:  19,500 tons
 Operator:  , 1 in service

 Durance-class replenishment oiler
 Builder:   / 
 Displacement:  17,900 tons
 Operators:
 :  4 in service
 :  1 in service, former Durance
 :  1 in service as HMAS Success (built in Australia)

 Fort Victoria-class replenishment oiler
 Builder: 
 Displacement:  32,818 tons
 Operator: , ( Royal Fleet Auxiliary), 1 in service

 Mashū-class replenishment oiler
 Builder: 
 Displacement: 25,000 tons
 Operator: : 2 in service

  replenishment oiler
 Builder:  / 
 Displacement: 27,500 tons
 Operator: 

 Patiño replenishment oiler
 Builder: 
 Displacement:  17,045 tons
 Operator:  , 1 in service

  replenishment tanker
 Builder:  
 Displacement:  25,000 tons
 Operator: :  1 in service

 Stromboli-class replenishment ship
 Builder:  
 Displacement:  8,700 tons
 Operator: :  2 in service

 Tide-class replenishment oiler
 Builder:  / 
 Displacement:  39,000 tons
 Operator: , ( Royal Fleet Auxiliary), 4 in service

 Towada-class replenishment oiler
 Builder: 
 Displacement: 15,000 tons
 Operator: : 3 in service

 Beiyou 572-class  replenishment oiler
 Builder: 
 Operator: : 4 in service

 Type 631-class replenishment oiler
 Builder: 
 Displacement: 2,300 tons
 Operator: : 7 in service

 Type 905 (Fuqing-class) replenishment oiler
 Builder: 
 Displacement: 21,750 tons
 Operator: : 1 in service

Transport tankers and oilers 
 Alyay-class fleet oiler (Project 160)
 Builder:  
 Displacement:  7,225 tons
 Operator:  :  4 in service

 Boris Chilikin-class fleet oiler (Project 1559)
 Builder:  
 Displacement:  22,460 tons
 Operator:  :  4 in service

 BAP Tacna fleet oiler
 Builder:  
 Displacement:  17,040 tons
 Operator:  , 1 in service

 Chesapeake-class transport tanker (AOT-5084)
 Builder:  
 Displacement:  65,000 tons
 Operator:  :  2 in commission

 Dubna-class fleet oiler
 Builder:  
 Displacement:  11,140 tons
 Operator:  :  2 in service

 Gus W. Darnell-class transport tanker (AOT-1125)
 Builder:  
 Displacement:  40,000 tons
 Operator:  :  5 in commission

 Henry J. Kaiser-class fleet oiler
 Builder:  
 Displacement:  42,000 tons
 Operators:
:  13 in commission
:  1 in commission

 Olekma-class fleet oiler
 Builder:  
 Displacement:  6,440 tons
 Operator:  :  2 in service

 Panarea-class gasoline tanker
 Builder:  
 Displacement:  863 tons
 Operator:  :  4 in service

 Rhön-class tanker
 Builder: 
 Displacement: 14,169 tons
 Operator: , 2 in service

 Rover-class tanker
 Builder: 
 Displacement: 11,500 tons (loaded)
 Operators:
 , 1 in service
 , 1 in service
  ( Royal Fleet Auxiliary), 2 in service

 Uda-class fleet oiler (Project 577)
 Builder:  
 Displacement:  7,160 tons
 Operator:  :  5 in service

 Vyaz'ma fleet oiler
 Displacement:  8,900 tons
 Operator:  

 Walchensee-class tanker
 Builder: 
 Displacement: 2,191 tons
 Operator: , 2 in service

 Wave-class tanker
 Builder: 
 Displacement: 34,500 tons
 Operator: , ( Royal Fleet Auxiliary), 2 in service

Coastal tankers 
 Fuzhou-class coastal tanker
 Builder:  
 Displacement:  1,200 tons
 Operator:  :  32 in service

 Jinyou-class coastal tanker
 Builder: 
 Displacement:  4,800 tons
 Operator:  :  3 in service

 Khobi-class coastal tanker
 Builder: 
 Displacement:  1,525 tons
 Operators: 
 : 1 delivered in 1959

 Leizhou-class coastal tanker
 Builder:  
 Displacement:  900 tons
 Operator:  :  9 in service

 Type 620 (Shengli-class) coastal tanker
 Builder:  
 Displacement:  4,940 tons
 Operator:  :  2 in service

 Type 632 (Fulin-class) coastal tanker
 Builder:  
 Displacement:  2,200 tons
 Operator:  :  19 in service

Water tankers 
 Simeto-class water tanker
 Builder:  
 Displacement:  1,968 tons
 Operators:
 :  2 in service
 :  1 in service

Tenders 
 Elbe-class (Type 404) tender
 Builder: 
 Displacement: 3,586 tons
 Operator : 6 in service

 Lubin-class small craft support ship
 Builder: BSO Split
 Displacement:  880 tons
 Operator:  :  1 in service of 3 built

 Rhin-class tender
 Displacement:  2,445 tons
 Operator:  :  2 in service

 Vis small craft command and support ship
 Builder:  ??
 Displacement:  680 tons
 Operator:

Buoy tenders 
 Class A Balsam-class buoy tender
 Builder:  
 Displacement:  1,025 tons
 Operators: 
 :  1 delivered in 1997 from the US Coast Guard
 :  5 in commission

 Gasconade-class river buoy tender (WLR-75401)
 Builder:  
 Displacement:  141 tons
 Operator:  :  9 in commission

 Juniper-class buoy tender (WLB-201)
 Builder:  
 Displacement:  2,000 tons
 Operator:  :  16 in commission

 Keeper-class buoy tender
 Builder:  
 Displacement:  840 tons
 Operator: :  14 in commission

 Ouachita-class buoy tender (WLR-65501)
 Builder:  
 Displacement:  143 tons
 Operator: :  6 in service

 Type 066 class buoy tender
 Builder:  
 Displacement:  70 tons
 Operator:  

 Type 744-class buoy tender
 Builder:  
 Displacement:  1750 tons
 Operator:  

 Type 911I-class buoy tender
 Builder:  
 Displacement:  135 tons
 Operator:  

 Type 999-class buoy tender
 Builder:  
 Displacement:  95 tons
 Operator:

Buoy tugs 
 Alcyon-class ocean tug and buoy tender
 Displacement:  1,500 tons
 Operator:  :  2 in service

Dive tenders 
 Type 904I-class dive tender
 Builder:  
 Displacement:  1,354.8 tons
 Operator:  

 Type 904II-class dive tender
 Builder:  
 Displacement:  1,327 tons
 Operator:  

 Vulcain diving tender
 Builder:  
 Displacement:  490 tons
 Operator:

Submarine tenders 
 Kashtan submersible support ship
 Displacement:  5,250 tons
 Operator:  

 Kommuna submersible support ship
 Displacement:  2,450 tons
 Operator:  

 Malina-class submarine tender (Project 2020)
 Builder:   / 
 Displacement:  13,900 tons
 Operator:  :  3 in service

 Mercuur class submarine tender
 Builder: 
 Displacement:  1,400 Tons
 Operator:  

 Pionier Moskvyy-class submersible support ship (Project 05360)
 Builder:  
 Displacement:  7,960 tons
 Operator:  :  4 in service

 Ugra-class submarine tender (Project 1886.1)
 Builder:  
 Displacement:  9,650 tons
 Operator:  :  2 in service

 Type 925 (Dajiang-class) submarine tender and salvage ship
 Builder:  
 Displacement:  10,087 tons
 Operator:  :  3 in service

 Type 926-class submarine support ship
 Builder:  
 Displacement:  9,500 tons
 Operator:  :  3 in service

Degaussing ships 
 Bereza-class degaussing ship (Project 130)
 Builder:  
 Displacement:  2,050 tons
 Operators: 
 :  17 in service
 :  1 in service

 Pelym-class degaussing ship (Project 1799)
 Builder:  
 Displacement:  1,200 tons
 Operator:  :  17 in service

 Type 911 degaussing ship
 Builder:  
 Operator:  : 2 in service

 Type 912 degaussing ship
 Builder:  
 Displacement:  828 tons
 Operator:  : 1 in service

 Type 912I degaussing ship
 Builder:  
 Operator:  : 1 in service

 Type 912III (Yanbai class) degaussing ship
 Builder:  
 Displacement:  570 tons
 Operator:  : 1 in service

 Type 912IIIA degaussing ship
 Builder:  
 Operator:  : 2 in service

 Type 912IIIAH degaussing ship
 Builder:  
 Operator:  : 3 in service

Repair ships 
 Aditya-class replenishment and repair ship
 Builder:  
 Displacement:  24,612 tons
 Operator:  :  1 in service

 Amur-class repair ship (Project 304)
 Builder:  
 Displacement:  5,500 tons
 Operator:  :  11 in service

 RFA Diligence fleet repair ship
 Builder:  
 Displacement: 10,765 tons
 Operator: , ( Royal Fleet Auxiliary), 1 in service

 Emory S. Land-class submarine tender/repair ship (AS-39)
 Builder:  
 Displacement:  22,900 tons
 Operator:  :  2 in commission

 Garonne-class small repair ship
 Displacement:  2,320 tons
 Operator:  

 Oskol-class repair ship (Project 300/301/303)
 Builder:  
 Displacement:  2,700 tons
 Operator:  :  8 in service

 Type 648 (Dadao-class) submarine repair ship
 Builder:  
 Displacement:  1,962 tons
 Operator:  :  1 in service

Dry docks 
 120t class dry dock
 Builder:  
 Displacement:  526.49 tons
 Operator:  :  1 in service

 Dongxiu 912-class dry dock
 Builder:  
 Operator:  :  1 in service

 Hua Chuan No. 1-class dry dock
 Builder:  
 Displacement:  13,000 tons
 Operator:  :  1 in service

Engineering vessels

Dredgers 
 Dredger 1 dredger
 Builder: 
 Operator: 

 8-m3 class dredger
 Builder: 
 Operator: 

 Beijun 204-class dredger
 Builder: 
 Operator: 

 Dongjun 417-class dredger
 Builder: 
 Operator: 

 Dongjun 433-class dredger
 Builder: 
 Operator: 

 Dongjun 434-class dredger
 Builder: 
 Operator: 

 Nanjun 610-class dredger
 Builder: 
 Operator:

Crane ships 
 Diamond State-class crane ship (ACS-7)
 Builder:  
 Displacement:  31,500 tons
 Operator:  :  2 in commission

 Gopher State-class crane ship (ACS-4)
 Builder:  
 Displacement:  25,000 tons
 Operator:  :  3 in commission

 Green Mountain State-class crane ship (ACS-9)
 Builder:  
 Displacement:  31,500 tons
 Operator:  :  2 in commission

 Keystone State-class crane ship (ACS-1)
 Builder:  
 Displacement:  31,500 tons
 Operator:  :  3 in commission

Construction ships 
 Anvil-class inland construction tender (WLIC-75301)
 Builder:  
 Displacement:  145 tons
 Operator:  :  8 in service

 Pamlico-class inland construction tender (WLIC-800)
 Builder:  
 Displacement:  416 tons
 Operator:  :  4 in commission

Cable laying ships 
 Type 890 (Youzheng-class) cable ship
 Builder:  
 Displacement:  750 tons
 Operator:  :  3 in service

 Type 991II (Youdian-class) cable ship
 Builder:  
 Displacement:  1,550 tons
 Operator:  :  9 in service, including 3 modified as buoy tenders

 USNS Zeus cable ship (ARC-7)
 Displacement:  15,000 tons
 Operator:

Surveillance and intelligence vessels

Ocean surveillance ships 
 Hibiki-class ocean surveillance ship
 Builder: 
 Displacement: 3,861 tons
 Operator: : 2 in service

 Impeccable-class Ocean Surveillance Ship (T-AGOS-23)
 Displacement:  5,368 tons
 Operator:  

 Stalwart-class Ocean Surveillance Ship (T-AGOS-1)
 Builder:  
 Displacement:  2,285 tons
 Operators

: 2 in service

 Victorious-class Ocean Surveillance Ship (T-AGOS-19)
 Builder:  
 Displacement:  3,370 tons
 Operator:  :  4 in commission

Electronic surveillance ships 
 Alpinist-class electronic surveillance ships (Project 503M)
 Builder:  
 Displacement:  1,140 tons
 Operator:  :  3 in service

 Bougainville electronic surveillance ship
 Displacement:  10,250 tons
 Operator:  

 FS Eger electronic surveillance ship
 Builder: 
 Displacement: 7,560 tons
 Operator: 

 Elettra-class electronic surveillance ship
 Builder 
 Displacement:  3,180 tons
 Operators:
  , NATO: 1 in service
  : 1 in service
  : 1 in service

 Lira-class electronic surveillance ship (Project 1826)
 Builder:  
 Displacement:  4,900 tons
 Operator:  :  1 in service

 FS Marjata electronic surveillance ship
 Builder: 
 Displacement: 5,300 tons
 Operator: 

 Oste-class (Type 423) electronic surveillance ship
 Builder: 
 Displacement: 3,200 tons
 Operator: : 3 in service

 Primor'ye-class electronic surveillance ship (Project 394B)
 Builder:  
 Displacement:  4,340 tons
 Operator:  :  2 in service

 Vishnaya-class electronic surveillance ship (Project 864)
 Builder:  
 Displacement:  3,470 tons
 Operator:  :  7 in service

 Type 814A (Dadie-class)  electronic surveillance ship
 Builder:  
 Displacement:  2,198 tons
 Operator:  :  1 in service

 Type 815-class electronic surveillance ship
 Builder:  
 Displacement:  6,000 tons
 Operator:  :  1 in service

 Type 815A-class electronic surveillance ship
 Builder:  
 Operator:  :  4 in service

 Type 815G-class electronic surveillance ship
 Builder:  
 Operator:  :  4 in service

Missile tracking ships 
 Monge missile tracking ship
 Displacement:  21,040 tons
 Operator:  

 Observation Island Missile Range Instrumentation Ship (T-AGM-23)
 Displacement:  17,000 tons
 Operator:  

 Waters navigation research and missile tracking ship (T-AGS-45)
 Displacement:  12,000 tons
 Operator:  

 Yuan Wang-class missile tracking and space event support ship
 Builder:  
 Displacement:  21,000 tons
 Operator:  :  4 in service

Research and scientific vessels 
 Alliance (A 5345) research ship
 Builder: 
 Displacement: 3,120 tons
 Operator: , NATO

  experimental ship
 Builder: 
 Displacement: 6,299 tons
 Operator: 

 RV Belgica coastal research ship
 Displacement:  835 tons
 Operator:  

 Helmsand-class trial and fleet service ships (Type 748)
 Builder: 
 Operator:  : 3 in service

 Leonardo (A 5301) research ship
 Builder 
 Displacement:  337 tons
 Operator:  

 Planet-class (Type 751) research ship (SWATH vessel)
 Builder: 
 Displacement: 3,500 tons
 Operator: : 1 in service

 Rossetti-class research ship
 Builder: 
 Displacement: 324 tons
 Operator: , 2 in service

 Shijian-class research ship
 Builder:  
 Displacement:  3,000 tons
 Operator:  :  3 in service

 Type 6610 (Shuguang-class) research ship
 Builder:  
 Displacement:  2,400 tons
 Operator:  :  8 in service

 Wilhelm Pullwer-class trial boat (Type 741)
 Builder: 
 Operator:  : 1 in service

 Xiangyanghong-class research ship
 Builder:  
 Displacement:  10,000 tons
 Operator:  :  12 in service in various configurations

 Yanlun-class research ship
 Builder:  
 Displacement:  2,000 tons
 Operator:  :  3 in service

 Yannan-class research ship
 Builder:  
 Displacement:  1,750 tons
 Operator:  :  4 in service

Acoustic research vessels 
 USNS Hayes acoustic trials ship (T-AG-195)
 Displacement:  4,000 tons
 Operator:  

  acoustic research ship
 Builder: 
 Displacement: 2,083 tons
 Operator:

Survey vessels 
 Baldur-class coastal survey ship
 Builder: 
 Displacement: 50 tons
 Operator: : 1 in commission

 ARA Comodoro Rivadavia coastal hydrographic survey ship
 Builder: 
 Displacement: 827 tons
 Operator: 

 Echo-class survey ship
 Builder 
 Displacement:  3,470 tons
 Operator:  : 2 in commission

 USNS John McDonnell coastal survey ship (T-AGS-51)
 Builder:  
 Displacement:  2,000 tons
 Operator:  :  2 in commission

 Lapérouse-class survey ship
 Displacement:  980 tons
 Operator:  :  4 in service

 Makar-class hydrographic survey catamaran
 Builder: 
 Displacement: 500 tons
 Operator: 

 Moma-class survey ship (Project 861)
 Builder:   / 
 Displacement:  1,600 tons
 Operator:  :  1 in service

 Sandhayak-class survey ship
 Builder: 
 Displacement: 1,960 tons
 Operator: : 7 in service

 HMS Scott ocean survey vessel
 Builder  
 Displacement:  13,500 tons
 Operator:   1 in service

 Type 635 A/B/C (Yanlai class) hydrographic survey ship
 Builder:  
 Displacement:  1,100 tons
 Operator:  :  4 in service

 Valerian Uryvayav-class survey ship
 Builder:  
 Displacement:  1,050 tons
 Operators: 
 :  1 delivered in 1991 for training and coastal survey

Hydro-oceanographic Survey vessels 
 ARA Austral (Q-21) hydro-oceanographic survey ship
 Builder: 
 Displacement: 4,952 tons
 Operator: 

 Ninfe-class hydro-oceanographic research ship
 Builder 
 Displacement:  415 tons
 Operator:  :  2 in service

Oceanographic Research vessels 
 Cabo de Hornos oceanographic research ship
 Builder:   / ASMAR Chile 
 Displacement:  3,020 tons
 Operator:  :  1 in service

 Ammiraglio Magnaghi oceanographic research ship
 Builder 
 Displacement:  1,744 tons
 Operator:  

 Melville-class oceanographic research/survey ship (T-AGOR-14)
 Builder:  
 Displacement:  2,670 tons
 Operator:  :  2 in commission

 Pathfinder-class oceanographic research/survey ship (AGS 60)
 Builder:  
 Displacement:  4,750 tons
 Operator:  :  6 in commission

 Thomas G. Thompson class oceanographic research/survey ship (T-AGOR-23)
 Builder:  
 Displacement:  3,250 tons
 Operator:  :  3 in commission

Polar Oceanographic Research vessels 
 BIO Las Palmas polar oceanographic research vessel
 Builder: 
 Displacement: 1,500 tons
 Operator: 

 ARA Puerto Deseado polar oceanographic survey vessel
 Builder: 
 Displacement: 2,400 tons
 Operator:

Icebreakers 
 Eisvogel-class icebreaker
 Builder: 
 Displacement: 560 tons
 Operators: 
: 1 in service
: 1 in service

 Type 272 class icebreaker
 Builder: 
 Displacement: 4,860 tons
 Operator: :  2 in service

Lake icebreakers 
 USCGC Mackinaw lake icebreaker (WLBB-30)
 Displacement:  3,500 tons
 Operator:

Electronic surveillance icebreakers 
 Type 071G class icebreaker and electronic surveillance ship
 Builder: 
 Displacement: 3,192 tons
 Operator: :  1 in service

Electronic surveillance / hydrographic research icebreakers 
 Type 210 class electronic surveillance / hydrographic research icebreaker
 Builder: 
 Displacement: 4,420 tons
 Operator: :  1 in service

Polar icebreakers 
 USCGC Healy polar icebreaker (WAGB-20)
 Builder: 
 Displacement:  16,400 tons
 Operator:  

 Polar-class polar icebreaker (WAGB-10)
 Builder:  
 Displacement:  13,600 tons
 Operator:  :  1 in commission

 Shirase (AGB-5003) polar icebreaker
 Builder: 
 Displacement:  20,000 tons
 Operator:

Polar patrol icebreakers 
 NoCGV Svalbard polar icebreaker/offshore patrol vessel
 Builder: 
 Displacement: 6,500 tons
 Operator:

Polar research icebreakers 
 ARA Almirante Irízar polar research icebreaker
 Builder: 
 Displacement:  14,899 tons
 Operator:

Polar oceanographic research icebreakers 
 BIO Hespérides polar oceanographic research icebreaker
 Builder: 
 Displacement: 2750 tons
 Operator:

Icebreaking tugs 
 Bay-class icebreaking tug (WTGB-101)
 Builder:  
 Displacement:  660 tons
 Operator:  :  9 in commission

Logistical support ships 
 Etna-class Logistics Support Vessel
 Builder:  
 Displacement:  13,400 tons
 Operator: 
 :  1 in service
 :  1 in service

 Honqui-class coastal freighter
 Builder:  
 Displacement:  1,950 tons
 Operator:  :  7 in service

 Qiongsha-class cargo ship
 Builder:  
 Displacement:  2,150 tons
 Operator:  :  1 in service

 HNoMS Valkyrien support ship
 Builder: 
 Displacement: 3,000 tons
 Operator: : 1 in service

 Vulcano-class Logistics Support Ship
 Builder:  
 Displacement:  23,500 tons
 Operator: :  1 on building

Multi role vessels 
  multi role vessel
 Builder:   / 
 Displacement:  9,000 tons
 Operator:

General cargo ships 
 Cape Ann-class general cargo ship (AK-5009)
 Builder:  
 Displacement:  20,110 tons
 Operator:  :  4 in commission

 Cape Breton-class general cargo ship (AK-5056)
 Builder:  
 Displacement:  21,000 tons
 Operator:  :  4 in commission

 Cape Girardeau-class container/bulk cargo ship (AK-2039)
 Builder:  
 Displacement:  32,000 tons
 Operator:  :  2 in commission

 Cape John-class general cargo ship (AK-5022)
 Builder:  
 Displacement:  23,000 tons
 Operator:  :  4 in commission

 Costa Sur-class container/general cargo ship
 Builder:  
 Displacement:  10,894 tons
 Operator:  :  3 in service

Container ships 
 MV Asterix container ship
 Builder:  
 Operator:  

 Page class container ship (AKR-4496)
 Builder:  
 Displacement:  74,500 tons
 Operator:  :  2 in commission

Prepositioning ships 
 1st Lt Harry L. Martin Marine Corps prepositioning ship (AK-3015)
 Builder:  
 Displacement:  51,531 tons
 Operator:  

 2nd Lieutenant John P. Bobo-class Marine Corps prepositioning ship (AK-3008)
 Builder:  
 Displacement:  46,000 tons
 Operator:  :  5 in commission

 Gordon-class army prepositioning ship (AKR-296)
 Builder:   / 
 Displacement:  65,000 tons
 Operator:  :  2 in commission

 Corporal Louis J. Hauge Jr.-class Marine Corps prepositioning ship (AK-3000)
 Builder:  
 Displacement:  44,000 tons
 Operator:  :  5 in commission

 Sergeant Matej Kocak-class Marine Corps prepositioning ship (AK-3005)
 Builder:  
 Displacement:  51,612 tons
 Operator:  :  3 in commission

 LCPL Roy M. Wheat Marine Corps prepositioning ship (AK-3016)
 Builder:   / 
 Displacement:  50,570 tons
 Operator:  

 Shughart-class army prepositioning ship (AKR-295)
 Builder:  
 Displacement:  54,300 tons
 Operator:  :  2 in commission

Vehicle ships 
 Algol-class fast vehicle cargo ship (AKR 287)
 Builder:  
 Displacement:  55,355 tons
 Operator:  :  8 in commission

 Bob Hope-class army vehicle prepositioning ship (AKR-300)
 Builder:  
 Displacement:  62,000 tons
 Operator:  :  7 in commission

 Cape Ducato-class roll-on/roll-off vehicle cargo ship (AKR-5051)
 Builder:   / 
 Displacement:  34,790 tons
 Operator:  :  5 in commission

 Cape Hudson-class vehicle cargo ship (AKR-5066)
 Builder:   / 
 Displacement:  51,000 tons
 Operator:  :  3 in commission

 Cape Island-class vehicle cargo ship (AKR-10)
 Builder:  
 Displacement:  33,900 tons
 Operator:  :  4 in commission

 Cape Knox-class vehicle cargo ship (AKR-5082)
 Builder:  
 Displacement:  29,200 tons
 Operator:  :  2 in commission

 Cape Lambert-class vehicle cargo ship (AKR-5077)
 Builder:  
 Displacement:  30,360 tons
 Operator:  :  2 in commission

 Cape Rise-class vehicle cargo ship (AKR-9678)
 Builder:  
 Displacement:  32,000 tons
 Operator:  :  3 in commission

 Cape Texas-class vehicle cargo ship (AKR-112)
 Builder:  
 Displacement:  24,550 tons
 Operator:  :  3 in commission

 Cape Vincent-class vehicle cargo ship (AKR-9666)
 Builder:  
 Displacement:  28,200 tons
 Operator:  :  2 in commission

 Cape Washington-class vehicle cargo ship (AKR-9961)
 Builder:  
 Displacement:  53,600 tons
 Operator:  :  2 in commission

 General Frank S. Besson-class Logistics Support Vessel (LSV-1)
 Builder:  
 Displacement:  4,199 long tons
 Operator:
 :  8 in commission
 :  2 in commission

 GySgt Fred W. Stockham army prepositioning ship (AK-3017)
 Builder:  
 Displacement:  55,500 tons
 Operator:  

 Round Table-class Landing Ship Logistic
 Builder:  
 Displacement:  6,000 to 8,751 tons
 Operator:  : 2 in service

 LTC Calvin P. Titus-class container/vehicle cargo ship (AK-5089)
 Builder:  
 Displacement:  48,000 tons
 Operator:  :  3 in commission

 Watson-class army prepositioning ship (AKR-310)
 Builder:  
 Displacement:  62,600 tons
 Operator:  :  8 in commission

Aviation logistics ships 
 Wright-class aviation logistics ship (T-AVB-3)
 Builder:  
 Displacement:  23,800 tons
 Operator:  :  2 in commission

Barge Carrier ships 
 Cape Fear-class barge carrier (AK-5061)
 Builder:  
 Displacement:  44,250 tons
 Operator:  :  2 in commission

 Cape Flattery-class barge carrier (AK-5070)
 Builder:  
 Displacement:  62,300 tons
 Operator:  :  2 in commission

Troop ships 
 Qiongsha-class troop ship
 Builder:  
 Displacement:  2,150 tons
 Operator:  :  4 in service

Polar logistics ships 
 Green Wave polar logistics ship (AK-2050)
 Builder:  
 Displacement:  9,500 tons
 Operator:

Rescue and salvage ships

Heavy-lift ships 
 Type 633 class heavy-lift ship
 Builder: 
 Operator: : 1 in service

Salvage ships 
 Type 922 class rescue and salvage ship
 Builder: 
 Displacement: 3,400 tons
 Operator: : 1 in service

 Type 922II (Dalang class) rescue and salvage ship
 Builder: 
 Displacement: 4,450 tons
 Operator: : 1 in service

 Type 922III (Dalang II class) rescue and salvage ship
 Builder: 
 Operator: : 1 in service

 Type 922IIIA (Dalang II class) rescue and salvage ship
 Builder: 
 Operator: : 3 in service

Salvage tugs 
 Abeille Flandre-class large salvage tug
 Displacement:  3,800 tons
 Operator:  :  2 in service

 Daozha-class salvage tug
 Builder:  
 Displacement:  4,000 tons
 Operator:  :  1 in service

 Fehmarn-class (Type 720) salvage tug
 Builder: 
 Displacement: 1,310 tons
 Operator: 

 Ingul-class salvage tug (Project 1452/1453)
 Builder:  
 Displacement:  4,000 tons
 Operator:  :  4 in service

 Neftegaz-class salvage tug (Project B-92)
 Builder:  
 Displacement:  4,000 tons
 Operator:  :  3 in service

 Prut-class salvage tug (Project 527M)
 Builder:  
 Displacement:  3,330 tons
 Operator:  :  2 in service

 Safeguard-class salvage tug (ARS-50)
 Builder:  
 Displacement:  3,300 tons
 Operator:  :  4 in commission

 Sliva-class salvage tug (Project 712)
 Builder:  
 Displacement:  3,000 tons
 Operator:  :  3 in service

 Tuozhong-class salvage tug
 Builder:  
 Displacement:  3,600 tons
 Operator:  :  4 in service

Fire tugs 
 Fire-class fireboat
 Builder:  
 Displacement:  140 tons
 Operator:  :  1 in service

 Iva-class fire rescue tug (Project B-99)
 Builder:  
 Displacement:  2,300 tons
 Operator:  :  4 in service

 Katun-class fire tug (Project 1893/1993)
 Builder:  
 Displacement:  1,200 tons
 Operator:  :  13 in service

Search and Rescue Vessels 
 San Juan-class Search and Rescue Vessel
 Builder: 
 Displacement: 540 tons
 Operator: Philippine Coast Guard: 4 in service

 Ilocos Norte class Search and Rescue Vessel
 Builder: 
 Displacement: 120 tons
 Operator: Philippine Coast Guard: 4 in service

 Type 917 class rescue ship
 Builder: 
 Operator: : 2 in service

Submarine Rescue ships 
 Alagez submarine salvage and rescue ship (Project 537)
 Displacement:  14,300 tons
 Operator:  

  submarine rescue ship
 Builder: 
 Displacement: 4,200 tons
 Operator: 

 Amatista Mod-class submarine rescue ship
 Builder: 
 Displacement: 1,860 tons
 Operator: : 1 in service

 HSwMS Belos submarine rescue ship.
 Operator:   

 Anteo submarine rescue ship
 Builder:  
 Displacement:  3,874 tons
 Operator:  

 Cheonghaejin class submarine rescue ship
 Builder: 
 Displacement: 4,300 tons
 Operator: : 1 in service

  submarine rescue ship
 Builder: 
 Displacement: 7,011 tons
 Operator: 

  submarine rescue ship
 Builder: 
 Displacement: 7,214 tons
 Operator: 

 Type 930 (Hudong class) submarine rescue ship
 Builder: 
 Displacement: 2,500 tons
 Operator: : 1 in service

 Type 946 (Dazhou class) submarine rescue ship
 Builder: 
 Displacement: 1,100 tons
 Operator: : 2 in service

 Type 946A (Dadong class) submarine rescue ship
 Builder: 
 Displacement: 1,500 tons
 Operator: : 1 in service

Torpedo recovery vessels 
  torpedo launch and recovery vessel
 Builder: 
 Displacement: 650 tons
 Operator: 

Builder: 
Displacement: 1190 tons
Operator: : 2 in service

Type 803 class torpedo retriever
 Builder: 
 Displacement: 94.67 tons
 Operator: 

Type 906 class torpedo trials craft 
 Builder: 
 Displacement: 2,300 tons
 Operator: :  1 in service

Type 907A class torpedo trials craft 
 Builder: 
 Displacement: 615 tons
 Operator: :  1 in service

Type 917 class torpedo retriever
 Builder: 
 Displacement: 742.5 tons
 Operator: :  7 in service

Pollution control ships 
 Bottsand-class (Type 738) oil recovery ship
 Builder: 
 Displacement: 650 tons
 Operator: : 2 in service

 Halli pollution control ship
 Builder: 
 Displacement: 2,100 tons
 Operator: 

 Hylje pollution control ship
 Builder: 
 Displacement: 1,400 tons
 Operator: 

 Louhi pollution control ship
 Builder: 
 Displacement: 3,450 tons
 Operator:

Tugs 
 Glen-class tug
 Builder:  
 Displacement:  259 tons
 Operator:  :  5 in service

 Habagat-class MT Tug (TB-271)
 Builder:  
 Displacement:  unknown
 Operator: Philippine Coast Guard

 IRS-class tug
 Builder: 
 Displacement: 472 tons
 Operator: :  3 in service

Anchor tugs 
 Chieftain anchor handling tug supply vessel
 Builder: 
 Displacement: 2,028 tons
 Operator: : 1 in service

Supply tugs 
 Rari-class supply tug
 Displacement:  1,550 tons
 Operator:  :  2 in service

Harbour tugs 
 Capstan-class (65 Foot) small harbour tug (WYTL-65601)
 Builder:  
 Displacement:  72 tons
 Operator:  :  10 in commission

 Lütje Hörn-class (Type 725) harbour tug
 Builder: 
 Operator: : 6 in service

 Porto-class harbour tug
 Builder:  
 Displacement:  412 tons
 Operator:  :  11 in service

 Sleipner-class harbour tug
 Builder: 
 Displacement: 300 tons
 Operator: : 2 in service

 Sylt-class (Type 724) large harbour tug
 Builder: 
 Operator: : 2 in service

 Ville-class harbour tug
 Builder:  
 Displacement:  46 tons
 Operator:  :  5 in service

 Wustrow-class (Type 414) harbour tug
 Builder: 
 Operator: : 2 in service

Coastal tugs 
 Belier-class coastal tug
 Displacement:  800 tons
 Operator:  :  3 in service

 Chamois-class coastal tug and logistical support ship
 Displacement:  505 tons
 Operator:  :  1 in service

Offshore tugs 
 Abnaki class fleet ocean tug
 Builder:  
 Displacement:  1,589 tons
 Operators:
:  2 in service
:  1 in service

 Atlante-class ocean tug
 Builder:  
 Displacement:  750 tons
 Operator:  :  2 in service

 Barentshav-class offshore patrol vessel
 Builder: 
 Displacement: 3,200 tons
 Operator: : 3 in commission

 Ciclope-class ocean tug
 Builder:  
 Displacement:  660 tons
 Operator:  :  6 in service

  offshore tug
 Builder: 
 Displacement: 560 tons
 Operator: 

 Goliat-class ocean tug (Project 733)
 Builder:  
 Displacement:  890 tons
 Operator:  :  25 in service

 Helgoland-class large sea-going tug
 Builder: 
 Operators: 
: 1 in service
: 1 in service

 MB-330 class ocean tug
 Builder:  
 Displacement:  1,180 tons
 Operator:  :  1 in service

 Powhatan class fleet ocean tug (ATF 168)
 Builder:  
 Displacement:  2,260 tons
 Operator:  :  5 in commission

 Roslavl-class ocean tug (Project A-202)
 Builder:   / 
 Displacement:  625 tons
 Operators:
 :  11 in service
 :  4 in service

 Sorum-class fleet seagoing tug (Project 745)
 Builder:  
 Displacement:  1,656 tons
 Operator:  :  22 in service

 Tenace-class ocean tug
 Displacement:  1,400 tons
 Operator:  :  2 in service

 Type 802 Gromovoy class ocean tug
 Builder:   / 
 Displacement:  890 tons
 Operator:  :  17 in service

 Type 837 Hujiu class ocean tug
 Builder:  
 Displacement:  750 tons
 Operator:  :  8 in service

 Wangerooge-class seagoing tug
 Builder: 
 Displacement: 798 tons
 Operators: 
: 2 in service
: 1 in service

Fleet tugs 
 Dinghai-class fleet tug
 Builder:  
 Displacement:  1,470 tons
 Operator:  :  2 in service

 Goryn-class fleet tug (Project 563)
 Builder:  
 Displacement:  2,200 tons
 Operator:  :  9 in service

Training ships 
See :Category:Training ships
 Amerigo Vespucci Tall ship
 Builder: 
 Displacement: 4,146 tons
 Operator: : 1 in service

 RFA Argus Aviation training ship
 Builder 
 Displacement 28,081 tons
 Operator: , ( Royal Fleet Auxiliary), 1 in service

 Arung Samudera Tall ship
 Operator: 

 Capitán Miranda Tall ship
 Builder: 
 Displacement: 852 tons
 Operator: 

 Cisne Branco Tall ship
 Builder: 
 Displacement: 1,038 tons
 Operator: 

 UAM Creoula Tall ship
 Builder: 
 Displacement: 1,321 tons
 Operator: 

  Tall ship
 Builder: 
 Operator: 

 Fabian Wrede-class training ship
 Builder: 
 Displacement: 65 tons
 Operator: : 3 in service

 USCGC Eagle Tall ship
 Builder: 
 Displacement: 1,813 tons
 Operator: 

 NRP Sagres Tall ship
 Builder: Blohm & Voss 
 Displacement: 1,755 long tons (1,783 tons)
 Operator: 
 Sister ship to USCGC Eagle

 Mircea Tall ship
 Builder: Blohm & Voss 
 Operator: 
 Sister ship to USCGC Eagle and NRP Sagres

 Gorch Fock Tall ship
 Builder: 
 Displacement: 2,006 tons
 Operator: 
 Sister ship to USCGC Eagle, NRP Sagres, and Mircea

 ARC Gloria Tall ship
 Builder: 
 Displacement: 1,300 tons
 Operator: 

 BAE Guayas Tall ship
 Builder: 
 Displacement: 1,300 tons
 Operator: 
 Sister ship to ARC Gloria

 Simón Bolívar Tall ship
 Builder: 
 Displacement: 1,260 tons
 Operator: 
 Sister ship to ARC Gloria and BAE Guayas

 ARM Cuauhtémoc Tall ship
 Builder: 
 Displacement: 1,800 tons
 Operator: 
 Sister ship to ARC Gloria, BAE Guayas, and Simón Bolívar

 Hiuchi-class training support ship
 Builder: 
 Displacement: 1,000 tons
 Operator: : 5 in service

 HNoMS Horten training ship
 Builder: 
 Displacement: 2,535 tons
 Operator: 

 Intermares training ship
 Builder: 
 Displacement: 3,200 tons
 Operator: 

 Juan Sebastián de Elcano Tall ship
 Builder: 
 Displacement: 3,673 tons
 Operator: 

 Esmeralda Tall ship
 Builder: 
 Displacement: 3,754 tons
 Operator: 
 Sister ship to Juan Sebastián de Elcano

 ARA Libertad Tall ship
 Builder: 
 Displacement: 3,765 tons
 Operator: 

 Mhadei-class training sailboat
 Builder: 
 Displacement: 23 tons
 Operator: : 2 in service

  training sailboat
 Builder: 
 Displacement: 93 tons
 Operator: 

 Palinuro Tall ship
 Builder: 
 Displacement: 1,341 tons
 Operator: : 1 in service

 Shiyan training ship
 Displacement:  6,000 tons
 Operator:  

  Tall ship
 Builder: 
 Displacement: 513 tons
 Operator: 

  Tall ship
 Builder: 
 Displacement: 513 tons
 Operator: 
 Sister ship to 

  training ship
 Builder: 
 Displacement: 3,200 tons
 Operator: 

 Type 82 training ship
 Builder: 
 Displacement:  6,000 tons
 Operator:   1 in service

 Type 679 (Zheng He-class) (NATO Daxing-class) training ship
 Builder: 
 Displacement:  5,548 tons
 Operator:  

 Type 680 (Qi Jiguang-class)  training ship
 Builder: 
 Displacement: 9,000 tons
 Operator: 

 Type 0891A (Shichang''-class)  training ship
 Builder: 
 Displacement: 9,700 tons
 Operator: 

 BAP Unión Tall ship
 Builder:  / 
 Displacement: 3,200 tons
 Operator: 

 Yanxi-class training ship
 Builder: 
 Displacement: 1,200 tons
 Operator:

Yachts 
 Argo (MEN209) Presidential Yacht
 Builder: 
 Displacement: 64.47 tons
 Operator: 

 HDMY Dannebrog Royal Yacht 
 Builder: 
 Displacement: 1,295 tons
 Operator: 

 ARA Fortuna III racing yacht
 Builder: 
 Displacement: 15.5 tons
 Operator: 

  accommodation yacht
 Builder: 
 Displacement: 490 tons
 Operator: 

 HNoMY Norge Royal Yacht
 Builder: 
 Displacement: 1,628 tons
 Operator:

See also 
 List of naval ship classes in service
 List of submarine classes in service

References

Auxiliary ship classes in service
Auxiliary ship classes